Richard Leslie Solomons (born 9 October 1961) is a British businessman. He was the chief executive of InterContinental Hotels Group until July 2017, when he was succeeded by Keith Barr.

Career
Solomons qualified as a chartered accountant with KPMG in 1985. He then worked in investment banking with Hill Samuel Bank for seven years, including two years in New York. He joined InterContinental Hotels Group in 1992.

Solomons was at IHG for nearly two decades before taking the helm in 2011. He served as Chief Executive of Intercontinental Hotels from July 2011 to July 2017. Prior to this role, he was Chief Financial Officer, and before that Head of Commercial Development since June 2009.

According to The Daily Telegraph, "Solomons' long tenure at the company should make it one of the FTSE's more seamless successions".

Personal life
Solomons is married with three children.

Notes

Living people
1961 births
British accountants
British bankers
British corporate directors
Alumni of the University of Manchester
KPMG people
People educated at University College School
Businesspeople from London
British chief executives
Chief financial officers
InterContinental Hotels Group people